Veyselli rock reliefs are a series of four rock reliefs in Erdemli district of Mersin Province, Turkey.

But the last  is impassable for motor vehicles. 

There are four figures; three soldiers and a woman. They are dated to Roman Empire era.

References

Erdemli District
Roman sites in Turkey
Rock reliefs in Turkey
Archaeological sites in Mersin Province, Turkey
Olba territorium